Unuamen also spelt Unuame is an ancient village community by Ovia river in Ovia North-East Local Government Area of Edo State, Nigeria. Unuame is one of the ancestral homes of  Oba Esigie's maternal grandfather and home town to some group of Binis (Benin people). The people of Unuame have remained loyal to the monarch since the establishment of the ancient Kingdom of Benin. Being a part of the Kingdom of Benin, Unuame is at the heart of the tropical rainforest in the southern part of Nigeria, way to the west of the delta of the Niger River and inland from the coast.

Unuame and the sub-camps within the domain it covers is strategically along the swampy terrains on the east bank of the Ovia/Osse river. In other words, the community is naturally bounded in the west by the Ovia/Osse river, the largest river in the Kingdom of Benin, and most of its economic activities revolve around it. The Ovia/Osse river flows through Unuame in the south-westerly direction to Ite, Ikoro, Gelegele and the  Ughoton (Gwato) creeks; into the Benin River, which empties into the Atlantic Ocean at the Bight of Benin.

Traditional Head 
The traditional head of Unuame is the "Okao of unuame", a recognised chieftaincy title and viceroy to the Benin Monarch. Since the reign of Oba Ewuare (I) (1440-1473), Unuamen has Okao as the village/traditional head overseeing and administering affairs. Okao of Unuamen is hereditary and gazetted.

Arrival Time of Unuame People on its Settlement 
The exact time of arrival of the people of Unuame to its land is not precisely known. But oral narration and different books by Nigerians and European explorers and Archaeologists agreed that the first settlers at Unuame date back to the first period (Ogiso era). Osamuyimen (2000) and Adodoh (2006) also believed that Unuame is one of the crucial villages which already existed in the Ogiso era (first period) in the 10th century. Unuame is known to have had a direct boundary with Omi village to the east at the time of the Ogisos, Oba Ewuare (1440-1473), Oba Ozolua (1480-1504) and Oba Esigie (1504-1547) among others. Today, between Unuame and Omi is Adeyanba, Okabeghe and Iguzama villages. Migrants originally founded these villages from Unuamen and Unuamen elders (edion) pegged the foundation tree (Ikhimwin) for Adeyanba, Okabeghe and Iguzama in keeping with the Benin tradition. From the Ogiso era, until Oba Esigie conquered Udo, the Ovia river at Unuame was reputed to be the boundary to exit or enter Igodomigodo land (Benin Kingdom). Giving weight to this claim, studies by Wesler and Allsworth-Jones (1998) maintained that the Ovia river at Unuame, between Benin and Udo, acted as the final boundary for the exiled and dead on their way out of Benin land, and also the point of entry for the Ife-based dynasty at Benin.

Economy 
The main occupation of the people of Unuame includes farming, palm wine tapping, basket weaving, the local distillation of gin, trading, mud sculpture, fishing, animal trapping and hunting. Although, it has clay, bitumen, kaolin and river/sharp sand, among other minerals. Harnessing most of its natural resources will bring a lot of economic benefits to the community and the state. Factories that use sharp sand and clay as raw materials could establish in the community.

Unuame, like most communities in Ovia North-East Local Government Area of Edo State, is highly affected by urban migration as young and educated sons and daughter migrate to larger cities and abroad for more lucrative job opportunities. One of the festivals celebrated in Unuame is Ovia festival, a very colourful and crowd-pulling festival. Ovia festival and other celebrations throughout the year could provide occupation for many locals, such as in cultural dances, catering and costume making. The village is mainly accessed from the capital city (Benin) by road. However, the people also use the boat and canoe to transport themselves from one end of the Ovia/Osse river to the other while selling their goods, and during their fishing escapade.

Historical Events in Unuamen Surrounding Different Obas 
Since time immemorial, Unuame has been at the centre of most historical events surrounding Obas, such as Oranmiyan (1170), Oguola, Orobiru, Ewuare, Ozolua and Esigie, among others, in the Kingdom. Perhaps, due to Unuame's location as the entry and exit point of the then Benin Empire.

Events in Unuame Relating to Oranmiyan (1170 A.D.) 
Oranmiyan about 1170 A.D. was received and hosted by Unuame "edion", during a brief stay, on his way to Benin from Ife. However, Nyame (1977) argued that the archaeological evidence at Unuame and Udo could mean that the advent of Oranmiyan and Ife traditions may have arrived later than most previous estimates.

Oranmiyan arrived Unuame from Ife via the western route, which was the "Uhe-Ayere-Ikare-Ogho-lfon-Usen-Unuame-Ego-Benin" route, on his way to Benin. Supporting this claim, Wesler and Allsworth-Jones (1998) pointed out that river Ovia between Benin and Udo at Unuame, was the point of entry for the Ife-based dynasty at Benin. Oranmiyan descended from a canoe at Unuame where he first had his legs on Benin land at a location known as "Eghute-Oba" (Oba's sea/river-shore) by the Ovia River. He was lodged at "Aro-Oleku" for a period before leaving Unuame for Benin through Ego. Although, it is uncleared how long Oranmiyan stayed at Unuame before continuing to Benin through Ego.

Events in Unuame Relating to Oba Oguola (1280-1295) 
During the reign of Oba Oguola (1280-1295), her daughter (Uvbi) made a stop at Unuame on her way to her betrothed husband Akpanigiakon in Udo. However, the princess did not like the idea of the marriage. Hence, she stayed briefly at Unuame where she was sheltered and protected by the elders before returning to Benin City. Uvbi's refusal to marry Akpanigiakon and her decision to return to Benin from Unuame prompted the war menace from Akpanigiakon which ended when Oba Oguola defeated him at the battle of Urhezen (Urhoezien).

Events in Unuame Relating to Oba Orobiru (1400-1432) 
In the reign of Oba Orobiru (1400-1432), elders welcomed and supported Prince Ogun (Ewuare I) when he arrived Unuame to cross the Ovia river and exit Benin. While at Unuame, Prince Ogun stayed a while before crossing the Ovia river to many different places, including Usen. Omoregie (1972) reiterated what Oba Orobiru said to his brother Prince Ogun on a quote: "Prince Ogun! I have ordered my guards to take you to Unuame on the Ovia River. You will cross that river, and if you return to my Kingdom during my lifetime, you will be killed".

Events in Unuame Relating to Oba Ewuare (I) (1440-1473) 
Oba Ewuare (1440-1473) the great, founder of the Benin Empire, made several visits to Unuame during his reign. During one of his tours (Ólogha) to Unuamen, he created the Okao title (also known as Traditional/District Head) as he launched Benin into the era of the warrior kings. In an effort to prevent the Empire from invasions through the Ovia River, Oba Ewuare (I) installed the Okao of Unuamen (traditional head), the first Okao on Benin land (Pers. Comm.). Oba Ewuare's (I) decision to install the first Okao in Unuame may have risen from three factors. First, Unuame was part of the ancient Benin-western route. Second, the Unuame river was the boundary/final frontier for people leaving or entering Benin land. Third, the hospitality Ewuare got when sent as a Prince to Unuame by his brother Oba Orobiru (1400-1432) while exiting Benin land could have also influenced his decision to install the first Okao in Unuame.

It can be recalled how passionate Ewuare was about Unuame, among other villages, as he occasionally refers to it in some of his famous adages. According to a lecture (the legacies of Oba Ewuare the Great) delivered by High Priest Osemwengie Ebohon in 2016, an old and ailing Oba Ewuare (I) ones told the Binis ostentatiously, on a quote: "Igbevb' Etete, Igbevb' Unuamen; Ovbokhan I y' ugieyonyonmwen". Meaning, "I danced in festivals at Etete village, I danced in festivals at Unuame village; No child can deride me with festivals".

Events in Unuame Relating to Oba Ozolua (1480-1514) 
Oba Ozolua (1480-1514) was a conqueror who also frequented Unuame during his reign to make vows before the Ovia of Unuame and offer sacrifices to it in order to have a peaceful reign in Benin. According to Jungwirth (1968), “when he got to Ovia N’Unuame he declared again if he returned safely from Ora he would offer a sacrifice with a ram, four feathers from a parrot, chalk and some cowries”.

Events in Unuame Relating to Queen Idia and The Fierce Battle Between Esigie (1504-1550) and Arhuanran 
Okao N’Unuame (traditional head of Unuamen) gave Oba Esigie (1504-1550) hospitality and backed him against his half-brother Arhuanran N'udo (the Duke of Udo) in a fierce battle for disrespecting the crown. Thus, the Okao of Unuame, who was also the Ohen-Ovia and Esigie’s maternal grandfather (Bradbury: n.d.: BS 282; Pers. Comm.), provided the needed support to fight the war from Unuame, and Oba Esigie eventually defeated Udo about A.D.1517.

According to Egharevba (1968: 26), The Nigerian Field Society (1975: 160), and WAJA (1976: 144), "at the start of the sixteenth century, Oba Esigie, with the help of his mother Queen Idia, gathered the Benin army at Unuame on the River Osse/Ovia and from there launched an attack which finally destroyed the might of Udo and his giant half-brother Arhuanran". Similarly, a study by Darling (1984) maintained that Queen Idia provided the crucial help Oba Esigie needed in Unuamen to cross the Ovia river, conquer Udo and win succession to the throne.

Before gathering the Benin army at Unuame to engage Udo, Queen Idia went to Unuame to vow to Ovia N'unuame (Unuame Ovia shrine) on behalf of Esigie so that he would emerge victorious over Arhuanran. While at Unuame, Queen Idia informed the Okao N’Unuame and elders of her mission and Esigie's pledge. Esigie had vowed to participate in the Ovia festival at Unuame and present the Okao N’Unuamen with the "Ada" (sword of state – authority) and "Eben" (ceremonial sword – power) if he defeats Arhuanran and Udo.

Prior to the defeat, the two half-brothers (Oba Esigie and Arhuanran) met each other for the last time in a conference at Unuame. Unable to reach a compromise, "the Benin army behind Esigie surged down to the embarkation point and invaded across the Ovia/Osse river to defeat Udo, their tens of thousands of feet wearing down a great, wide gully to the waterside".

Oba Esigie At the Unuame Ovia Festival (Ehor-Ovia) 
Oba Esigie went to Unuamen to redeem the pledge made to Ovia N'Unuame. Elders recalled how Esigie lived in Unuame for three years (Ukpiha) during the Ovia festival (Ehor-Ovia). He took part in the festival and passed through initiation (Ógua) throughout this period. According to Egharevba (1949: 86), "dancing and masquerades form an important part of Ovia festival, which were elaborated by King Esigie who made the groove at Unuame the centre of the Ovia Cult". During the festival, he presented the Okao of Unuame with an "Ada" and "Eben".

Further, Oba Esigie granted the Okao of Unuame (who was also the divinely ordained Ohen-Ovia) the privilege to appoint an Ohen-Ovia to assist in Ovia rituals/rites as a token for his part in the victory over Arhuanran/Udo. Henceforward, at the Unuame Ovia altar and during Ovia rites, the Okao sits on the right side while Ohen sits on the left side. Apart from the Okao of Unuame, who appoints Ovia priest to only assist in serving the Ovia deity for the Oba, Ikao of other communities with Ovia shrines, such as "Okao of Iyera" and "Okao of Ugbihiehie", among others, still combines their role as the traditional head (Okao) and Ohen-Ovia. Therefore, granting Okao of Unuame the privilege to have an Ohen-Ovia could suggest strong evidence of the royal link with the Okao (who was also the Ovia Priest) as pointed out by Bradbury (n.d.), Darling (1984), Ben-Amos (1979) and Olupona (2000).

Before and since Ovia N'Unuame (Unuame Ovia) helped Oba Esigie (1504-1550) in defeating Arhuanran and conquering Udo, Unuame has been the centre of the Ovia cult. "Nearly all Benin Kingdom villages which practice the Ovia shrines claim that these got introduced during Esigie's reign. No doubt the prestige associated with the victory over Udo was an important factor in making Ovia N'Unuame, the most widespread cult in Benin. Today, the Unuame primary school is named after Esigie; and the Unuame edion can point out  Esigie's monument, although now a heap of the earth". Queen Idia's Pot is still covered by leaves near a long heap of sherds and ashes by the Ovia River in Unuame. "Here annual offerings are made by the Unuame elders. One of the most magnificent of Benin's sixteenth-century bronzes, the institutionalisation of the Queen Mother and the widespread Ovia cult are all claimed to relate to these events at Unuame".

Unuamen Artifacts and Historical Reserve 
Unuamen, a surrounding neighbourhood of Okomu Forest Reserve and serene community with the conducive climatic condition and environmentally friendly people, has Ecotourism assets. A stretched layout of rainforest land with rich and diverse flora and fauna and a variety of wildlife, among which is the endangered white-throated monkey and African dwarf crocodile. An open, well stretched out Ovia/Osse river with free-flowing current and annual hydropower potential of 61.619 MW, runs on Unuame western borders. This southerly flowing Ovia/Osse river is also  Okomu Forest Reserve's main drainage and eastern boundary, therefore, making Unuame one of its peripheral communities as shown on the map of Okomu Forest Reserve. It is a beautiful sight to behold. A river beach should be on it for recreation! Unuame has many other attractions, artifacts and historical sites.

In 2017, the Edo State Commissioner for Arts, Culture, Tourism and Diaspora; Hon Osazee Osemwengie-Ero, visited the historical locations in Unuame on behalf of the State Governor, Mr Godwin Nogheghase Obaseki. Expressing delight at the historical sites, the commissioner said on a quote: "Today I have seen what I read in books about Oba Esigie and Queen Idia and where the event happened. It is overwhelming. What I saw in Unuamen are worth preserving as they take us way back to over 300 years ago".

The Unuame Government proposed Tourism Centre known as "UNUAMEN HISTORICAL RESERVE" hoist the entry route of Oranmiyan (1170-1200) into Benin kingdom; the renowned Queen Idia Pots, waterpots and food bowls (Okebu) used in cooking for Benin army and hosting Udo warriors to a mysterious defeat. Annually, the Unuamen people create a cultural celebration, whereby the elders of the community offer prayers at the POTS. There is also the Odighi where Ovia anchored and the location of the conference/meeting place where Oba Esigie and Arhuanran met each other for the last time. Additionally, there is Oba Esigie's war camp, monument (a mound) and precious stone (Okuta-Esigie) used during the famous war against Udo and Arhuanran, to mention but a few. Consequently, Unuamen has become a tourist destination for students of history (Vanguard Nigeria, 2018).

References

Populated places in Edo State